Pen Studios (formerly Pen India Limited) is an Indian film production and distribution company established by Dr. Jayantilal Gada on 31 March 1987. Based in Mumbai, it mainly produces and distributes Hindi, Telugu and Tamil films.

In 1992, the business was restructured under the name Popular Entertainment Network, and began to acquire video rights for movies to be distributed over various media such as video cassettes, satellites, terrestrial platforms, etc. The company subsequently forayed into theatrical and distribution rights of movies.

In the past few years, Pen Studios has produced films such as Kahaani and Shivaay, with many A-listers, that have been a huge success at the box office. The company, now, is also expanding by focusing on producing good regional content.

Gearing up for the next major growth spurt in the media and entertainment industry, Pen is setting up its own digital media platforms, and will offer unique services at reasonable prices for Indian consumers.

Pen India Limited launched a new Television Channel named WOW. WOW's content library is full of various Bollywood music and old classic Bollywood movies to new Hindi, Gujarati, Hindi dubbed (Telugu, Tamil, Kannada and Malayalam) films, and TV series such as Mahabharat.

Initial years
Dr. Jayantilal Gada started as a small-time entrepreneur with a video library called Popular Video Cassette Co in 1984. Later, he went into trading of video rights and distribution of VHS tapes across India by establishing Asia's biggest video shop, "Popular Video", at Lamington Road, Mumbai.

Brief history
Restructured and formed Popular Entertainment Network Limited (with brand name 'PEN') in  1992 and started dealing in copyrights of Hindi feature films viz. video, satellite and Doordarshan (DD).

PEN was the largest content provider of Hindi feature films to channels.
In 1995, PEN created another landmark by telecasting Sholay 20 years after its theatrical release on Doordarshan and creating a record with the highest ever Television viewing ratings (76 TRPs) with about 7.5 crore revenues.

In 1996, Sony TV telecast Sholay to celebrate its first anniversary and gained the number-one position among satellite channels, beating Zee TV for the first time.

Daughter Bhavita Jayantilal Gada also joined PEN in 2006 and started an animation division with mega projects like Mahabharat.

Nephew Kushal Kantilal Gada joined the group in 2007 after graduating in management studies.

In 2009, son Dhaval Gada, after completing his course at Whistling Woods International Institute, joined PEN to streamline production activities.

Film history
In 2012, PEN's maiden production Kahaani with Sujoy Ghosh proves successful at the box office.

In 2013, PEN released three projects: Issaq, released all over India in 900 theatres. Singh Saab the Great on 1970 screens in India. Mahabharat 3D animation feature film also released in 300 theatres.

In 2014, PEN completed and finally released Sholay 3D in 780 theatres in India. PEN also co-produces and distributes Nagesh Kukunoor's Art House film Lakshmii on 82 screens, Entertainment in 3,200 screens worldwide. PEN also distributed and released Ekkees Toppon Ki Salaami on 490 screens and Ketan Mehta's Rang Rasiya on 890 screens.

PEN has been associated in the past with films such as Sauda (1995), Kohram (1999), Lal Baadshah (1999), Kitne Door Kitne Paas (2002), Shararat (2002), and Yeh Mera India (2009) as rights=holders and not as a production.

Filmography

Production 
The following is a list of notable films in which Jayantilal Gada Pen India Ltd has been involved.

Distribution 
Rajini Murugan (2016)
Si3 (2017)
Zero (2018)
Badla (2019)
Family Of Thakurganj (2019)
Malaal (2019)
Judgementall Hai Kya (2019)
Jabariya Jodi (2019)
Dream Girl (2019)
Ghost (2019)
Satellite Shankar (2019)
Marjaavaan (2019)
Jawaani Jaaneman (2020)
Love Aaj Kal (2020)
Kaamyaab (2020)
Angrezi Medium (2020)
Coolie No. 1 (2020)
 Bell Bottom (2021)
 Chehre (2021)
 RRR (Hindi version) (2022)
 Jersey (2022)
 Acharya (Hindi version) (2022)
 Vikram (Hindi Version) (2022)
 Ponniyin Selvan: I (Hindi version) (2022)
 Dobaaraa (2022)
 Chup: Revenge of The Artist (2022)
 Yodha (2022 film) (2022)
 Sita Ramam (Hindi version) (2022)
 Hanu Man (Hindi version) (2023)
 Project K (Hindi Version) (2023/2024)

References

External links
 Pen India Ltd
 
 Pen India Ltd-YouTube
 

Film production companies based in Mumbai
Indian companies established in 1987
1987 establishments in Maharashtra
Film distributors of India
Mass media companies established in 1987